Balleh River is a river in Sarawak, Malaysia. It is a tributary of the Rajang River. In 1983 it was navigated by Redmond O'Hanlon and James Fenton. The journey is described in O'Hanlon's book, Into the Heart of Borneo.

See also
 List of rivers of Malaysia

References

Rivers of Sarawak
Rivers of Malaysia